Queen Sheba's Ring is a 1910 adventure novel by H. Rider Haggard set in central Africa. It resembles the author's earlier works King Solomon's Mines and She, featuring plotting priests, beautiful women, and daring British adventurers.

References

External links
Queen Sheba's Ring at Project Gutenberg
 

Novels by H. Rider Haggard
1910 British novels
1910 fantasy novels